Cornulariidae is a family of soft corals in the suborder Stolonifera.

Genera
The World Register of Marine Species includes the following two genera in the family:
Cervera Lopez-Gonzalez, Ocana, Garcia-Gomez & Nunez, 1995
Cornularia Lamarck, 1816

References

 
Stolonifera
Cnidarian families